Mashburn is a surname. Notable people with the surname include:

Brian Mashburn (21st century), guitarist and vocalist in the ska band Save Ferris
Jamal Mashburn (born 1972), American professional basketball player
Jesse Mashburn (born 1933), American athlete
Joe Mashburn (21st century), Dean of the Gerald D. Hines College of Architecture at the University of Houston